Sir Andrew Ryan  (5 November 1876 – 31 December 1949) was a British diplomat. He was Consul-General to Morocco from 1924 to 1930, Minister to Saudi Arabia from 1930 to 1936,  and Consul-General to Albania from 1936 to 1939.

Andrew was born 5 November 1876 in Rochestown, Co. Cork, Ireland the son of Edward Ryan, a soap and candle manufacturer of Douglas, Cork, and Matilda Ryan (nee O'Connor). He was educated at the Christian Brothers College, Cork and studying at Queens College Cork gaining a BA in Greek and Latin from the Royal University of Ireland, and Emmanuel College, Cambridge. His sister was Prof.Mary Ryan the first female professor in Ireland or the UK, their brother Sir Thomas Ryan (1879–1934) worked in the Indian Civil Service, and their youngest brother was the Dominican priest and  Bishop Patrick Finbar Ryan OP, Archbishop of Port of Spain, Trinidad.

In 1913 he married Ruth Margaret van Millingen of Dunblane, Perthshire, they had two children the Roman Catholic theologian and philosopher Columba Ryan and cartoonist John Ryan.

Ryan's autobiography, The Last of the Dragomans, was published by Geoffrey Bles in 1951.

References

External links
 

Ambassadors of the United Kingdom to Morocco
Ambassadors of the United Kingdom to Saudi Arabia
Ambassadors of the United Kingdom to Albania
1876 births
1949 deaths
Companions of the Order of St Michael and St George
Knights Commander of the Order of the British Empire
Members of HM Diplomatic Service
20th-century British diplomats
People from County Cork
People educated at Christian Brothers College, Cork
Alumni of the Royal University of Ireland
Alumni of University College Cork